The relict leopard frog (Lithobates onca) is a species of frog in the family Ranidae, endemic to the United States. It is found along the Colorado river in extreme northwestern Arizona, and adjacent Nevada and southwestern Utah, although its present range seems to be restricted to the Lake Mead National Recreation Area. Its natural habitat is freshwater springs and their outlets. It is threatened by habitat loss to agriculture and water development as well as invasive species.

References

External links
Rana onca recordings

Lithobates
Amphibians described in 1875
Amphibians of North America
Amphibians of the United States
Endemic fauna of the United States
Taxonomy articles created by Polbot